Pfeifer is a German-language occupational surname meaning "whistler" or "pipe-" or "fife-player" and etymologically akin to English Piper and Fifer; other spellings include Pfeiffer.  The spelling Pfeifer may refer to:

People:
Carl Ferdinand Pfeifer, United States Navy officer and aide to Presidents Harry S. Truman and Dwight D. Eisenhower
Felix Pfeifer (1871–1945), German sculptor and medallist
George Pfeifer, former head men's basketball coach at the University of Idaho
Hellmuth Pfeifer (1894–1945), German general who commanded the 65. Infantrie Division during World War II
Jörg Pfeifer (born 1952), East German athlete who competed mainly in the 100 metres
Joseph L. Pfeifer (1892–1974), United States Representative from New York
Karl Pfeifer, (born 1928), Austrian journalist
Louis Fred Pfeifer (1876–1917), private in the United States Marine Corps who received the Medal of Honor
Marcuse Pfeifer (1936–2020), American gallerist
Melanie Pfeifer, German slalom canoeist who has competed since the late 2000s
Michael David Pfeifer (born 1937), Roman Catholic bishop of the Diocese of San Angelo
Paul Pfeifer (born 1942), American politician of the Ohio Republican party
Philip Pfeifer (born 1992), American baseball player
Rolf Pfeifer (born 1947), professor of computer science at the Department of Informatics, University of Zurich
Scott Pfeifer (born 1977), Canadian curler from Sherwood Park who plays out of the Saville Sports Centre in Edmonton
Viktor Pfeifer (born 1987), Austrian figure skater
Will Pfeifer (born 1967), American comic book writer
Communities:
Pfeifer, Kansas, unincorporated community in Ellis County, Kansas, United States

See also
Pfeifer Broz. Music, musical consultant and production team (Jeffrey & Robert Pfeifer)
Pfeifer Zeliska .600 Nitro Express revolver, Austrian single-action revolver produced by Pfeifer firearms
Pfeiffer (disambiguation)